Michael Ken-Wai Lum (born October 27, 1945) is a former Major League Baseball player and coach who became the first American of Japanese ancestry to play in the major leagues when he debuted with the Atlanta Braves in . He currently serves as the hitting coach with the GCL Pirates.

Early years
Lum was born in Honolulu, Hawaii to a Japanese woman and American soldier and was adopted as a baby by a Chinese couple, Mun Luke and Winnifred Lum. He attracted interest from Michigan State University and attended Brigham Young University on a football scholarship for one semester in the fall of  after having signed with the Milwaukee Braves as an amateur free agent back in June.

A speedy runner, Lum was converted to an outfielder in the Braves' organization after having played first base in high school. He logged just a .925 fielding percentage his first professional season with the Waycross Braves Georgia–Florida League, but his defense steadily improved over his five seasons in the minors.

Atlanta Braves
Making his major league debut as a pinch hitter on September 12, Lum singled in his first major league at-bat against the New York Mets' Jack Fisher. With the Braves trailing 3-2 in the ninth, Lum came around to score the game tying run of their 4-3 victory. He started the second game of a September 17 double header in centerfield, and remained the team's starting center fielder over the remainder of the season.

With starting left fielder Rico Carty out for the  season with tuberculosis, Lum platooned with Tito Francona in left, while occasionally spelling a day off for Hank Aaron in right and Felipe Alou in center. Lum went two-for-two with a double in the 1969 National League Championship Series against the New York Mets.

On May 22, 1969, with the Braves leading the Mets 12-0 in the 7th inning, Mike pitch-hit for Hank Aaron who was 2 for 3 with a home run, single and a walk. Lum doubled. He was one of three players to ever pinch-hit for Aaron.

Lum hit three home runs and drove in five of the eight runs the Braves scored against the San Diego Padres on July 3, . He finally earned a starting job in right field in  when Aaron was converted to a first baseman.
 
In , Aaron was moved back into the outfield, and Lum began seeing most of his playing time at first base. He batted a career-high .294, while also logging career highs in home runs (16), runs batted in (82), runs scored (74), extra base hits (48) and at-bats (513). After two more seasons as a fourth outfielder and back-up first baseman, Lum was acquired by the defending World Series Champion Cincinnati Reds for Darrel Chaney on December 12, 1975.

Cincinnati Reds
Playing time was hard to come by for the "spare parts" of the "Big Red Machine." Lum saw far less playing time in Cincinnati than he was used to, as he averaged just 156 plate appearances per season in his three years with the Reds. In , he reached the post-season for the second time in his career. He logged just one at-bat in the 1976 National League Championship Series with the Philadelphia Phillies, flying out in game three to end the seventh inning. He never came to bat in the World Series against the New York Yankees. 

Following the  season, Lum took part in a tour of Japan with the Cincinnati Reds. Aware that Lum was to become a free agent at the end of the season, the Seibu Lions offered him a three-year deal worth one million dollars. He declined, returning to the Braves, instead.

Return to Atlanta
Lum began the  season as the Braves' starting first baseman, however, star catcher Dale Murphy was moved to first base at the start of May, removing Lum from the starting line-up. Delegated to pinch hitting duties, Lum led the National League with seventeen. He remained in that role until his release on May 1, . He signed with the Chicago Cubs shortly afterwards; on August 12, he clubbed a two-run home run off Terry Leach of the New York Mets for the 100th pinch hit of his career.

Career stats

Lum batted .246 as a pinch hitter over his career. On May 22, 1969, Lum cracked a two RBI double off the New York Mets' Al Jackson pinch hitting for Hank Aaron. He is one of only six players ever to pinch hit for Aaron. Lee Maye had done so in 1962 and Johnny Blanchard in 1965. Johnny Briggs, Marty Perez, and Mike Hegan did it after Lum.

Coaching
Following his one season in Japan, Hank Aaron, now the Braves' minor-league farm director, invited Lum to Spring training  to coach with the extended Spring program. Following Spring training, he became a coach with the Anderson Braves of the South Atlantic League.

Following the passing of White Sox hitting coach Charley Lau that March, Lum assisted his replacement, Joe Nossek over the rest of the season. He was fired at the end of the season despite the fact that the Chisox won eleven more games, drove in 55 more runs, and had a higher batting average (.253, vs .247 in 1984).

The following season, he held the same job with the Kansas City Royals. He remained at that post through . In  he joined the Milwaukee Brewers organization as hitting coach for the class A South Atlantic League's West Virginia Power, and was named the South Atlantic League "Coach of the Year."

When the Hawaii Winter League resumed play in  after eight inactive seasons, Lum joined the North Shore Honu. After just one season, he returned to the Brewers organization as minor-league hitting coordinator. In , he joined the Pittsburgh Pirates organization as hitting coach for the Gulf Coast League Pirates.

References

External links
, or Retrosheet, or SABR Biography Project, or Pura Pelota

1945 births
Águilas Cibaeñas players
American expatriate baseball players in the Dominican Republic
American adoptees
American baseball players of Japanese descent
American expatriate baseball players in Japan
Atlanta Braves players
Austin Braves players
Baseball players from Honolulu
Binghamton Triplets players
Cardenales de Lara players
American expatriate baseball players in Venezuela
Chicago Cubs players
Chicago White Sox coaches
Cincinnati Reds players
Florida Instructional League Braves players
Hawaii people of Japanese descent
Living people
Kansas City Royals coaches
Major League Baseball first basemen
Major League Baseball left fielders
Major League Baseball right fielders
President Theodore Roosevelt High School alumni
Richmond Braves players
Sportspeople from Honolulu
Tigres de Aragua players
Waycross Braves players
Yakima Braves players
Yokohama Taiyō Whales players